A list of horror films released in 1997.

References

Lists of horror films by year
1997-related lists